Doug Whiteford was an Australian racing driver.

Whiteford raced from the mid-1930s through to 1975 with a short period of inactivity during the 1960s. He was best known as a competitor in the Australian Grand Prix which he won three times in four years. He raced a Talbot-Lago T26 Formula One car which he used to win his second and third Grands Prix. His third win was at the first Albert Park street circuit which today hosts the modern Australian Grand Prix. Whiteford first contested the Australian Grand Prix in 1948 and continued to compete in the race regularly up to 1961 with a final appearance in the 1964 event. Whiteford also raced touring cars well into the 1970s. As a regular member of the Datsun Racing Team he was a fixture in small capacity Datsuns, usually as partner to John Roxburgh.

Doug Whiteford died on 15 January 1979.

Career results

References

Australian racing drivers
Grand Prix drivers
1979 deaths
Tasman Series drivers
Year of birth missing